The 2002 Indy Racing League (IRL) was one of transition, with two reigning CART championship teams, Team Penske and Target Chip Ganassi Racing, joining the series with full time entries.  The Oldsmobile engine was rebranded as a Chevrolet, and both Honda and Toyota announced their participation in the series starting in 2003 while Infiniti announced its withdrawal. 

Sam Hornish Jr. won 5 races on his way to his second straight championship ahead of Penske juggernaut Hélio Castroneves, winner of two races including a second straight Indy 500, on his way to second in the championship.

Confirmed entries

Season Summary

Schedule

Race results 

BOLD indicates a Superspeedway.
Note: All races running on Oval/Speedway.

Race summaries

Grand Prix of Miami
This race was held on March 2 at Homestead-Miami Speedway. Sam Hornish Jr. won the pole.

Top ten results
4- Sam Hornish Jr.
6- Gil de Ferran
3- Hélio Castroneves
9- Jeff Ward
11- Eliseo Salazar
52- Tomas Scheckter
21- Felipe Giaffone
44- Alex Barron
99- Anthony Lazzaro
14- Airton Daré

Bombardier ATV 200
This race was held on March 17 at Phoenix International Raceway. Hélio Castroneves won the pole.

Top ten results
3- Hélio Castroneves
6- Gil de Ferran
4- Sam Hornish Jr.
11- Eliseo Salazar
7- Al Unser Jr.
2- Jaques Lazier
91- Buddy Lazier
98- Billy Boat
55- Rick Treadway
20- Hideki Noda

Inaugural Yamaha Indy 400
This race was held on March 24 at California Speedway. Eddie Cheever won the pole.

Top ten results
4- Sam Hornish Jr.
2- Jaques Lazier
34- Laurent Rédon
6- Gil de Ferran
3- Hélio Castroneves
21- Felipe Giaffone
91- Buddy Lazier
8- Scott Sharp
19- Jimmy Vasser
9- Jeff Ward

Inaugural Firestone Indy 225
This race was held on April 21 at Nazareth Speedway. Gil de Ferran won the pole.

Top ten results
8- Scott Sharp
21- Felipe Giaffone
6- Gil de Ferran
24- Sarah Fisher
3- Hélio Castroneves
44- Alex Barron
51- Eddie Cheever
98- Billy Boat
99- Anthony Lazzaro
12- Shigeaki Hattori

86th Indianapolis 500
The Indy 500 was held on May 26 at Indianapolis Motor Speedway. Bruno Junqueira sat on pole. The race end was one of the most controversial in history as Paul Tracy passed Hélio Castroneves just as the yellow was coming out for a crash. Race officials ruled that the pass occurred after the yellow.

Top ten results
3- Hélio Castroneves
26- Paul Tracy
21- Felipe Giaffone
44- Alex Barron
51- Eddie Cheever
20- Richie Hearn
39- Michael Andretti
31- Robby Gordon
9- Jeff Ward
6- Gil de Ferran

Boomtown 500
This race was held on June 8 at Texas Motor Speedway. Tomas Scheckter won the pole.

Top ten results
9- Jeff Ward
7- Al Unser Jr.
14- Airton Daré
3- Hélio Castroneves
21- Felipe Giaffone
12- Shigeaki Hattori
98- Billy Boat
91- Buddy Lazier
99- Richie Hearn
44- Alex Barron

Radisson Indy 225
This race was held on June 16 at Pikes Peak International Raceway. Gil de Ferran won the pole.

Top ten results
6- Gil de Ferran
3- Hélio Castroneves
4- Sam Hornish Jr.
21- Felipe Giaffone
8- Scott Sharp
7- Al Unser Jr.
34- Laurent Rédon
51- Eddie Cheever
14- Airton Daré
44- Alex Barron

SunTrust Indy Challenge
This race was held on June 29 at Richmond International Raceway. Gil de Ferran won the pole.

Top ten results
4- Sam Hornish Jr.
6- Gil de Ferran
21- Felipe Giaffone
52- Tomas Scheckter
7- Al Unser Jr.
14- Airton Daré
20- Richie Hearn
9- Jeff Ward
54- Robby McGehee
44- Alex Barron

Ameristar Casino Indy 200
This race was held on July 7 at Kansas Speedway. Tomas Scheckter won the pole.

Top ten results
14- Airton Daré
4- Sam Hornish Jr.
3- Hélio Castroneves
21- Felipe Giaffone
6- Gil de Ferran
8- Scott Sharp
91- Buddy Lazier
44-Alex Barron
98- Billy Boat
20- Richie Hearn

Firestone Indy 200
This race was held on July 20 at Nashville Superspeedway. Billy Boat won the pole.

Top ten results
44- Alex Barron
6- Gil de Ferran
4- Sam Hornish Jr.
20- Richie Hearn
12- Raul Boesel
51- Eddie Cheever
21- Felipe Giaffone
8- Scott Sharp
3- Hélio Castroneves
7- Tony Renna

Inaugural Michigan Indy 400
This race was held on July 28 at Michigan International Speedway. Tomas Scheckter won the pole.

Top ten results
52- Tomas Scheckter
53- Buddy Rice
21- Felipe Giaffone
7- Tony Renna
6- Gil de Ferran
3- Hélio Castroneves
4- Sam Hornish Jr.
23- Sarah Fisher
8- Scott Sharp
20- Richie Hearn

Belterra Casino Indy 300
This race was held on August 11 at Kentucky Speedway. Sarah Fisher won the pole, the first by a female driver in a major open wheel series.

Top ten results
21- Felipe Giaffone
4- Sam Hornish Jr.
91- Buddy Lazier
8- Scott Sharp
3- Hélio Castroneves
7- Al Unser Jr.
78- Tony Renna
23- Sarah Fisher
44- Alex Barron
24- Robbie Buhl

Gateway Indy 250
This race was held on August 25 at Gateway International Raceway. Gil de Ferran won the pole.

Top ten results
6- Gil de Ferran
3- Hélio Castroneves
44- Alex Barron
52- Buddy Rice
4- Sam Hornish Jr.
24- Robbie Buhl
7- Al Unser Jr.
12- Raul Boesel
2- Vítor Meira
51- Eddie Cheever

Delphi Indy 300

This race was held on September 8 at Chicagoland Speedway. Sam Hornish Jr. won the pole.

Top ten results
4- Sam Hornish Jr.
7- Al Unser Jr.
91- Buddy Lazier
3- Hélio Castroneves
51- Eddie Cheever
21- Felipe Giaffone
8- Scott Sharp
2- Vítor Meira
52- Buddy Rice
15- Dan Wheldon

Gil de Ferran was injured during a crash in this race and would miss the season finale at Texas.

Chevy 500
This race was held on September 15 at Texas Motor Speedway. Vítor Meira won the pole.

Top ten results
4- Sam Hornish Jr.**
3- Hélio Castroneves
2- Vítor Meira
8- Scott Sharp
44- Alex Barron
52- Buddy Rice
91- Buddy Lazier
51- Eddie Cheever
78- Tony Renna
34- Laurent Rédon

Max Papis filled in for the injured Gil de Ferran at Penske; however, he finished 21st due to a blown engine.

By winning the race, Sam Hornish Jr. won his second championship in a row.

Final points standings 

 Ties in points broken by number of wins, followed by number of 2nds, 3rds, etc., and then by number of pole positions, followed by number of times qualified 2nd, etc.

See also 
 2002 Indianapolis 500
 2002 Infiniti Pro Series season
 2002 CART season
 2002 Toyota Atlantic Championship season
 http://www.champcarstats.com/year/2002i.htm
 http://media.indycar.com/pdf/2011/IICS_2011_Historical_Record_Book_INT6.pdf  (p. 119–121)

Footnotes

Indy Racing League
IndyCar Series seasons
 
Indy Racing League